Apteromechus is a genus of hidden snout weevils in the beetle family Curculionidae. There are more than 20 described species in Apteromechus.

Species
These 23 species belong to the genus Apteromechus:

 Apteromechus debilis Champion, 1906
 Apteromechus deciduus Champion, 1906
 Apteromechus ferratus (Say, 1831)
 Apteromechus flavopunctatus Champion, 1906
 Apteromechus leucospilus Champion, 1906
 Apteromechus longulus Champion, 1906
 Apteromechus longus (LeConte, 1876)
 Apteromechus melanostigma Champion, 1906
 Apteromechus microstictus Fall, 1925
 Apteromechus nitidifrons Champion, 1906
 Apteromechus opacifrons Champion, 1906
 Apteromechus parvus Champion, 1906
 Apteromechus pigmentatus Champion, 1906
 Apteromechus pumilus (Boheman, 1837)
 Apteromechus punctiventris Champion, 1906
 Apteromechus rugipectus Champion, 1906
 Apteromechus rugirostris Champion, 1906
 Apteromechus rugulifrons Champion, 1906
 Apteromechus scabrosus Champion, 1906
 Apteromechus stigmosus Champion, 1906
 Apteromechus subfasciatus Champion, 1906
 Apteromechus suffrago Faust, 1896
 Apteromechus texanus Fall, 1925

References

Further reading

 
 
 

Cryptorhynchinae
Articles created by Qbugbot